Douglas Jemal (born November 30, 1942) is a real estate developer, landlord, and the founder of Douglas Development.

Biography
Jemal was born to a Syrian Jewish family in South Brooklyn, one of four sons and two daughters of Norman Jemal and Sally Chira, a discount retailer in lower Manhattan. He dropped out of high school.

Retail 
His first foray into retail began in the 1960s, when he and his younger brother Lawrence Jemal, opened a store called Bargaintown in Washington, D.C. and soon after, a discount electronics store. In 1976, they returned to New York with their newfound expertise and along with two other brothers - Marvin Jemal and Stephen Jemal - founded the discount electronics chain Nobody Beats the Wiz (the name of their father's favorite Broadway musical) Douglas sold his share back to the family in 1993. The chain went bankrupt in 1997.

Real estate 
Jemal took the proceeds and began investing in Washington, D.C. real estate which was opportune as the city was in the midst of a down cycle. His success was compounded by the fact that he recognized that retail was under-present in D.C. (with half the national average of retail space per capita) and focused his efforts on high-end retailers. He is also known for borrowing heavily to support his purchases and paying his contractors late to fund even more purchases. Riding the wave of D.C.'s gentrification, he developed over ten million square feet of space through 2007, transforming the East End neighborhood near the Verizon Center, the Navy Yard neighborhood on the Anacostia River near Nationals Park, the Shaw neighborhood, and Chinatown into lively areas of mix of retail, restaurants, and housing. He has been criticized for sitting on derelict properties rather than developing outright as well as and charging very high rents and forcing out long-standing local tenants.

His method of doing business led to numerous lawsuits and a federal investigation and charges. In July 2006, he was acquitted on federal charges of bribery, conspiracy, and tax evasion but convicted on the charge of wire fraud. The wire charge conviction involved the taking of a loan with his business partner (and uncle of his son-in-law) Joseph Cayre. Jemal took the proceeds from the loan and used it to support the purchase of another property unbeknownst to his business partner. He was sentenced to a $175,000 fine and received five years probation. As stated by Judge Urbina at the conclusion of the Sentencing Hearing: "One thing is clear: Mr. Jemal has devoted much of his adult life to good, charitable causes", Urbina said. "When I compare the valuable and worthwhile services [repeat offenders] provide to society and I see what Mr. Jemal has done over the course of his lifetime, it is inconceivable to me that I should impose the penalty proposed here. . . . Being fair means being fair."

On December 5, 2019, Jemal was inducted into the Washington Business Hall of Fame.

On January 20, 2021, Jemal received a pardon for his 2008 wire fraud conviction from President Donald Trump.

Buffalo real estate
In 2016, he purchased One Seneca Tower, the tallest building in Buffalo, New York, with plans to convert it into a mixed-use development including retail, restaurant, hotel, office and apartment components.  The tower had been expected to have its renovations completed by the end of 2021. Jemal then went on to add the Hyatt Regency Hotel, the former headquarters building of the Buffalo Police, the HSBC Atrium building, and the five-story Mahoney state office building to his portfolio of Downtown Buffalo, and in 2020 he acquired the Statler City complex in Buffalo, following the death of its previous and local owner Mark D. Croce, which Jamal immediately began renovating. And Jemal plans to build a new nine-story building at 61 Terrace Street, in what is known locally as the “Donut Lot”.

Further afield from the downtown area he purchased the 64-acre Boulevard Mall with major urban renewal plans for the property, and has negotiated a long-term lease to run, and update the Hotel Henry on the Richardson Olmsted Campus, since renamed, The Richardson Hotel, and reopened in March 2023.

In 2020, Douglas Jemal purchased a $1.425 million house in the Nottingham Terrace area of Buffalo.

Personal life
Jemal'e sons Norman Jemal and  Matthew Jemal are now active in the real estate business. His daughter, Kim Jemal Cayre, is married to the nephew of New York real estate developer and record producer Joseph Cayre. Jemal, his wife and four daughters live in New Jersey.

References

External links
Douglas Development

American Sephardic Jews
American real estate businesspeople
American people of Syrian-Jewish descent
Living people
1942 births
American landlords
People convicted of fraud
Recipients of American presidential pardons